Giovanni Battista Crivelli (died March 1652) was an Italian composer.

External links

References

Italian Baroque composers
Italian male classical composers
Year of birth missing
1652 deaths
17th-century Italian composers
17th-century male musicians